Editorial independence is the freedom of editors to make decisions without interference from the owners of a publication. Editorial independence is tested, for instance, if a newspaper runs articles that may be unpopular with its advertising clientele or critical of its ownership.

See also

 Embedded journalism
 Freedom of the press, the freedom from interference by governments
 Media independence
 Media manipulation
 Objectivity (journalism)

Related controversies
 Fox television and Monsanto Company This story is featured at length in the documentaries The Corporation and Outfoxed.

References

Concentration of media ownership
Journalism
Journalism standards
Mass media issues